Beta-N-acetylgalactosaminidase (N-acetyl-beta-galactosaminidase, N-acetyl-beta-D-galactosaminidase, beta-acetylgalactosaminidase, beta-D-N-acetylgalactosaminidase, N-acetylgalactosaminidase) is an enzyme with systematic name beta-N-acetyl-D-galactosaminide N-acetylgalactosaminohydrolase. This enzyme catalyses the following chemical reaction:
 Hydrolysis of terminal non-reducing N-acetyl-D-galactosamine residues in N-acetyl-beta-D-galactosaminides

References

External links 
 

EC 3.2.1